Stadionul Moldova may refer to:

 Stadionul Moldova (Roman), a multi-use stadium in Roman, Moldavia,  Romania
 Stadionul Moldova (Speia), a sports stadium in Speia, Moldova